The year 2022 is the 19th year in the history of the Wu Lin Feng, a Chinese kickboxing promotion. The events are broadcast on Henan Television in mainland China and streamed on Douyin and Xigua Video.

List of events

Wu Lin Feng 527

Wu Lin Feng was a kickboxing event held on January 1, 2022, in Tangshan, China.

Background
A 61kg bout between Zhao Chongyang and Leeseethuan Chadchay was scheduled for the event.

Results

Wu Lin Feng 528

Wu Lin Feng 528 was a kickboxing event held on March 26, 2022, in Zhengzhou, China.

Results

Wu Lin Feng 2022: WLF in Cambodia

Wu Lin Feng 529: Cambodia was a kickboxing event held on April 10, 2022, in Angkor, Cambodia.

Results

Wu Lin Feng x Huya Kung Fu Carnival 6

Wu Lin Feng x Huya Kung Fu Carnival 6 was a martial arts event held on July 9, 2022, in Zhengzhou, China.

Results

Wu Lin Feng 531

Wu Lin Feng 531 was a martial arts event held on September 24, 2022, in Zhengzhou, China.

Results

Wu Lin Feng 532

Wu Lin Feng 532 was a martial arts event originally scheduled on November 26, 2022, in Zhengzhou, China. The event was postponed due to the covid restrictions in China and rescheduled as a two parts event on December 9 and 10.

Results

See also
 2022 in Glory 
 2022 in K-1
 2022 in ONE Championship
 2022 in Romanian kickboxing

References

2022 in kickboxing
Kickboxing in China